Landmark University is a private Christian university, affiliated with the Living Faith Church Worldwide and located in Omu-Aran, Kwara State, Nigeria. In 2014, it was featured among the top five universities in Nigeria by Webometrics.

Governance 

World Mission Agency (WMA), a Christian mission organization, founded by Dr. David Oyedepo, is the umbrella governing body of Landmark University. The Chancellor, Dr. David Oyedepo, serves as the chairman of the board of trustees of the World Mission Agency. The board of trustees of the World Mission Agency is responsible for the appointment of members of the Board of Regents (Governing Council) of Landmark University. The Board is the apex governing body of the University.

The pro-chancellor of the university was Pastor Yemi Nathaniel. His appointment took effect from August 2014. According to the chancellor, the role of the pro-chancellor is to facilitate decision making and approval process in the university as well as spiritual oversight of the university community. The position of pro-chancellor has been retired.

The current vice-chancellor is Professor Charity Aremu  who replaced Professor Adeniyi Olayanju.

Agrarian Revolutionary Drive 
The chancellor of Landmark University has on multiple occasions highlighted that the university is aimed at improving the agricultural sector of the Nigeria and Africa at large. Before the Oil boom of the 1970s, Nigeria's economy was thriving as an agrarian economy and the nation gave attention to Agriculture. After the Oil Boom, the agriculture industry in Nigeria has been on a decline, the Nation that was a onetime exporter of several cash crops has become import-dependent so much that it cannot on its own feed its population talk less of exporting to other countries. Landmark University aims to start off an agrarian revolution in Nigeria and Africa that would restore the Nations lost glory and redirect its attention to the many natural earthen resources that it has.

The university encourages its students to venture into agriculture whether it is their core discipline or not and encourages the enrollment of Nigerian students into Agriculture-related courses through scholarships and Career talks. In addition to this, the university has pioneered a Certificate and Diploma Course in Agripreneurship in Nigeria, a program designed to enlighten its participants on the entrepreneurial opportunities that exist in Agriculture.

The University has made ties with several leading Agriculture Institutions both in Research and practice and many other institutions in the pursuance of their agrarian revolutionary drive. Some of these institutions are the International Institute of Tropical Agriculture (IITA) and National Space Research and Development Agency (NASRDA).

In nearly 7 years of existence, the university runs 6 Agriculture related programs, namely Agricultural Economics, Agricultural Extension and Rural Development, Animal Science, Crop Science, Soil Science and Agricultural and Biosystems Engineering and has graduated over 388 agriculture professionals. The school also has a total of 1,059 hectares of farming land; 320 hectares on the university property in Omu-Aran, Kwara State, 354 hectares at Eleyin Village along the Omu-Aran-Ilorin highway and 385 hectares at Agbonda also in Kwara State. According to the former Vice-chancellor of the school, Professor Aize Obayan, Landmark University produces most of the food items consumed on its campus and sells farm produce to its neighboring communities. Some of the agricultural products of the University's farm are eggs, frozen chicken, fish, soya beans, cassava, rice, fufu flour and many others including innovative agricultural products like the Brown Rice.

Academic Programmes

College of Agricultural Sciences
Agricultural Extension and Economics
Agricultural Extension and Rural Development
Agricultural Economics
Animal Science
Crop and Soil Sciences
Food Science and Nutrition

College of Business and Social Sciences

School of Business

 Economics
 Accounting
 Business Administration
 Banking and finance

School of Social Sciences

 Economics
 International relations
 Mass communication
 Political Science
 Sociology

College of Science and Engineering

School of Pure and Applied Sciences

 Industrial Physics
 Industrial Chemistry
 Industrial Mathematics
 Computer Science
 Biochemistry
 Microbiology
 Geophysics

School of Engineering

 Chemical Engineering
 Electrical Engineering
 Civil Engineering
 Mechanical Engineering
 Agricultural and Bio-system Engineering
 Mechatronics Engineering

Campus life 
The university is situated on its campus in Omu-Aran Kwara state, where all its academic activities take place. As of 2014, Landmark University had a student population of 2684 including international students from other African countries. Landmark University holds mid-week church services for her students every Tuesday and Thursday between the hours of 8:00 am and 9:45 am. Each student is expected to attend at least one of these services every week. All students are required to live on the university's campus in the hostels built for them. Students are expected to be back in their respective hostels before 9:00 pm daily.

The school provides opportunities for students to be involved in practical skill acquisition sessions as a part of the school's Entrepreneurial Development Studies (EDS) course. Students learn various skills including bead making, soap making, fashion design, automobile works, fishery, and many others.

Former Vice-Chancellors 
 Professor Mathew Ajayi - 2011 to July 2014. 
 Professor Joseph Afolayan - August 2014-August 2015
 Professor Aize Obayan - August 2015 – July 2017
 Professor Olayanju Adeniyi - August 2017 – September 2021

Notable faculty 

Professor Aize Obayan - former Vice-chancellor

See also 
 Landmark University Secondary School
 Education in Nigeria
 Covenant University

References

Education in Kwara State
Educational institutions established in 2011
2011 establishments in Nigeria
Landmark University
Evangelical universities and colleges
Christian universities and colleges in Nigeria